This is a list of seasons completed by the Baylor Bears men's college basketball team since its inception in 1912. The list documents season-by-season records, conference standings, NCAA appearances, and championships won.

Baylor belonged to the Southwest Conference from 1915–1995 before joining the Big 12 Conference in 1996. The team has five regular-season conference championships, four NIT appearances, and six NCAA tournament appearances.

Key

Season-by-season results

}}
  Season cancelled after Round Rock train disaster.
  Van Sweet went 0–11 and Jeff Mangold went 0–6 as head coaches, respectively.
  Carroll Dawson went 10–7 and Jim Haller went 1–10 as head coaches, respectively.

References

 
Baylor
Baylor Bears basketball seasons